Fekete (Hungarian for “black”) may refer to:

Fekete (surname)
 Fânaţe (Fekete in Hungarian), a village in Band Commune, Mureș County, Romania
Fekete polynomial
Franz Fekete Stadium